was a freight-only airline based in Japan. Founded September 27, 2002, it ceased operations on March 22, 2004 after declaring bankruptcy. Their fleet included 3 Beech 1900C aircraft. The official bankruptcy decision was acknowledged by the government in August 2005.

Code data
ICAO Code: ORJ
Callsign: Orange Cargo

References

Defunct airlines of Japan
Airlines established in 2002
Defunct cargo airlines
Airlines disestablished in 2004
Japanese companies established in 2002
Japanese companies disestablished in 2004